The Flash is an ongoing American comic book series featuring the DC Comics superhero of the same name. Throughout its publication, the series has primarily focused on two characters who have worn the mantle of the Flash: Barry Allen, the second Flash (1959–1985, 2010–2020), and Wally West, the third Flash (1987–2006, 2007–2008, 2021–present). The series began at issue #105, picking up its issue numbering from the anthology series Flash Comics which had featured Jay Garrick as the first Flash.

Although the Flash is a mainstay in the DC Comics stable, the series has been canceled and restarted several times. The first volume, starring Barry Allen, was canceled at issue #350 prior to the character's death in Crisis on Infinite Earths. A new series began in June 1987 with a new issue #1, starring Wally West as the new Flash. The second volume was briefly canceled in 2006 at issue #230 in the wake of the Infinite Crisis event in which Wally disappeared, and was replaced by a new series titled The Flash: The Fastest Man Alive starring Bart Allen as the fourth Flash. The following year, The Flash: The Fastest Man Alive was canceled and The Flash resumed publication from issue #231 with Wally as the Flash once again; however, this volume was ultimately canceled permanently in 2008 at issue #247. 

Following Barry's resurrection in Final Crisis and return to being the primary Flash in The Flash: Rebirth, a third volume starring Barry debuted in 2010. However, this volume was ultimately cancelled in the lead-up to the miniseries Flashpoint, which in turn led into The New 52 continuity reboot. A fourth volume was later launched in 2011 as part of the new continuity, with Barry Allen as the sole Flash; this volume ultimately concluded in 2016. A fifth volume was launched soon after as part of the DC Rebirth line-wide relaunch. In 2020 the series reverted to original numbering by adding together all issues of The Flash from each volume, as of issue #750. The series is a part of DC's Infinite Frontier line-wide relaunch, beginning with issue #768, with Wally West once again as its main character.

Publication history

Volume 1 (1959–1985)

Volume 1 starred Barry Allen as the Flash and the series assumed the numbering of the original Flash Comics with issue #105 (March 1959) written by John Broome and drawn by Carmine Infantino. Comics historian Les Daniels noted that "The Flash" was a streamlined, modernized version of much that had gone before, but done with such care and flair that the character seemed new to a new generation of fans. The Broome and Infantino collaboration saw the introduction of several supervillains many of whom became part of the Rogues. The Mirror Master first appeared in issue #105 and the following issue saw the debuts of Gorilla Grodd and the Pied Piper. Captain Boomerang first challenged the Flash in issue #117 (December 1960) and the 64th century villain Abra Kadabra was introduced in issue #128 (May 1962). Another villain from the future, Professor Zoom first appeared in issue #139 (September 1963).

Kid Flash and the Elongated Man were respectively introduced in issues #110 and 112 as allies of the Flash. One of the most notable issues of this era was issue #123 (September 1961), which featured the story titled "Flash of Two Worlds". In it, Allen meets his inspiration Jay Garrick, after accidentally being transported to a parallel universe where Garrick existed. In this previous continuity, Garrick and the other characters of the Golden Age only existed as comics characters in the mainline shared universe. This brought about a new concept in the formative stage of what would become the DC Universe, and gave birth to the current conceptualization featuring it as a multiverse.

Barry Allen married his longtime love interest Iris West in issue #165 (November 1966).
Infantino's last issue was #174 (November 1967) and the next issue saw Ross Andru become the new artist of the series as well as featuring the second race between the Flash and Superman, two characters known for their super-speed powers.

The series presented metafictional stories featuring comics creators appearing within the Flash's adventures such as the "Flash — Fact Or Fiction" in issue #179 in which the Flash finds himself on "Earth Prime". He contacts the "one man on Earth who might believe his fantastic story and give him the money he needs. The editor of that Flash comic mag !"  Julius Schwartz helps the Flash build a cosmic treadmill so that he can return home.  Several years later, the series' longtime writer Cary Bates wrote himself into the story in issue #228. Four months after the cancellation of his own title, Green Lantern began a backup feature in The Flash #217 (August-September 1972) and appeared in most issues through The Flash #246 (January 1977) until his own solo series was revived. Schwartz, who had edited the title since 1959, left the series as of issue #269 (January 1979).
 
Bates wrote The Flash #275 (July 1979) wherein the title character's wife, Iris West Allen was killed. Don Heck became the artist of the series with issue #280 (December 1979) and drew it until #295 (March 1981). The Flash #300 (August 1981) was in the Dollar Comics format and featured a story by Bates and Infantino. Doctor Fate was featured in a series of back-up stories in The Flash from #306 (February 1982) to #313 (Sept. 1982) written by Martin Pasko and Steve Gerber and drawn by Keith Giffen. A major shakeup occurred in the title in the mid-1980s. The Flash inadvertently kills his wife's murderer, the Reverse-Flash, in The Flash #324 (August 1983). This led to an extended storyline titled "The Trial of the Flash" in which the hero must face the repercussions of his actions. Bates became the editor as well as the writer of The Flash title during this time and oversaw it until its cancellation in 1985. "The Trial of the Flash" was collected in a volume of the Showcase Presents series in 2011.

Shortly before Barry Allen's death in Crisis on Infinite Earths, the series was cancelled with issue #350 (October 1985). In the final issue of Crisis on Infinite Earths, Wally West, previously known as Allen's sidekick Kid Flash, stated his intent to take up his uncle's mantle as the Flash.

Volume 2 (1987–2006, 2007–2008)

Featuring Wally West as the main character, the second volume was launched by writer Mike Baron and artist Jackson Guice in June 1987. The second volume originally went in a different direction from the series starring Barry Allen by making Wally West a public figure with no secret identity, as well as making him more flawed: this Flash could not constantly maintain his super-speed because of his hypermetabolism, and would consume gargantuan amounts of food in order to continue operating at top speed. This metabolic limitation would later be continued into Barry Allen's character for the brief television series The Flash broadcast in 1990–91, as well as The Flash series which debuted in 2014, though to a lesser degree.

From issue #15 (August 1988) the series was taken over by writer William Messner-Loebs and artist Greg LaRocque. The new creative team introduced many aspects to the series that would become mainstays of the character Wally West, including inventing his love interest and eventual wife Linda Park, moving him from New York to Jay Garrick's hometown of Keystone City, and reintroducing the Pied Piper (a former foe of Barry Allen) as an ally whose positive influence helps Wally become more responsible and altruistic. Issue #53 (August 1991), in which the Pied Piper is revealed to be gay, won the inaugural GLAAD Media Award for Outstanding Comic Book in 1992. Messner-Loebs left the title at issue #61 (April 1992).

Mark Waid began his tenure on the title with issue #62 (May 1992); LaRocque departed the title with issue #79 (August 1993) and was replaced by Mike Wieringo. To help take Wally out of Barry and Jay's shadows, Waid made him much more powerful than either of his predecessors by introducing an extradimensional energy source referred to as the "Speed Force", through which he could channel near-limitless energy; the Speed Force has since become a cornerstone of Flash mythology. More emphasis was also placed upon the legacy of speedsters throughout DC history: Jay Garrick was reintroduced as a supporting character as of issue #73 (February 1993); former Quality Comics character Quicksilver was reinvented as the elder mentor character Max Mercury in issue #76 (May 1993); Barry Allen's future grandson Bart Allen, soon to become the speedster hero Impulse, was introduced in issue #92 (July 1994). Brian Augustyn became co-writer with Waid from issue #118 (October 1996) to the end of his tenure. For a period of one year, over issues #130–141 (October 1997 – September 1998), Waid and Augustyn stepped away from the series and were replaced by co-writers Mark Millar and Grant Morrison. Wally West married Linda Park in issue #159 (April 2000), Waid and Augustyn's last regular issue on the title.

When writer Geoff Johns stepped aboard with issue #164 (September 2000), he refocused the character on some aspects of tales starring Barry Allen from the Silver Age of Comic Books by putting more focus on the Rogues, some of which were new incarnations of old characters, and spending single issues on building their psychology. Johns created Zoom, the third of the Reverse-Flashes. He also fleshed out the environmental character of Keystone City in an attempt to make it unique in comparison to other fictional DC cities such as Metropolis or Gotham City, while also reintroducing Barry's hometown of Central City and having Wally split his time near-equally between the two locations. Following issue #200 (September 2003), Wally's secret identity was restored. Johns ended his run with issue #225 (October 2005).

In the wake of Wally West's disappearance in Infinite Crisis, DC canceled The Flash (vol. 2) with issue #230 (March 2006) in favor of a new series launched as part of the "One Year Later" event, starring Bart Allen as the Flash. The new series, titled The Flash: The Fastest Man Alive, ran only 13 issues and ended with Bart's death. The Flash (vol. 2) resumed with issue #231 (October 2007), with the return of Wally West as the Flash; Wally and Linda's children Iris and Jai, both speedsters, became major supporting characters. Mark Waid was brought back as writer but departed after six issues, after which the series brought in new writers for each new story arc. The series was canceled again at issue #247 in late 2008 with the return of Barry Allen in the event series Final Crisis.

Volume 3 (2010–2011)

Spinning out of Final Crisis, writer Geoff Johns and artist Ethan Van Sciver created The Flash: Rebirth, a 6-issue mini-series bringing Barry Allen back to a leading role in the DC Universe as the primary Flash. Barry Allen is also an integral character in the crossover event Blackest Night, and had a self-titled limited series tying into the main event. In 2010, DC Comics announced that after the completion of The Flash: Rebirth and Blackest Night, Geoff Johns would return to writing a new Flash ongoing series with artist Francis Manapul. In January 2010, DC Comics announced that the series' opening arc would be launched under the banner of Brightest Day, a line-wide aftermath story to the crossover "Blackest Night". In April 2010, DC released The Flash: Secret Files and Origins 2010 one-shot, setting the stage for the status quo of the new series. It was followed one week later with the release of The Flash (vol. 3) #1. On June 1, 2011, it was announced that all series taking place within the shared DC Universe would be either canceled or relaunched with new #1 issues, after a new continuity was created in the wake of the Flashpoint event. The Flash was no exception, and the first issue of the new series was released in September 2011.

Volume 4 (2011–2016)
In September 2011, The New 52 rebooted DC's continuity. In this new timeline, DC Comics relaunched The Flash with issue #1, with writing and art handled by Francis Manapul and Brian Buccellato.<ref>{{gcdb series|id= 61181|title= The Flash vol. 4'}}</ref> As with all of the titles associated with the DC relaunch, Barry Allen appears to be about five years younger than the previous incarnation of the character. Superheroes at large have appeared only in the past five years, and are viewed with at best, suspicion, and at worst, outright hostility. In this new continuity, Barry's marriage to Iris West never took place, and he is instead in a relationship with longtime co-worker Patty Spivot. In this new series, the Flash draws deeper into the Speed Force, enhancing his mental abilities while still trying to get a full grasp on his powers, which he doesn't yet exert total control over.

As revealed in issue #0 of this series, Barry Allen's father was placed in prison for the murder of his mother. While the evidence seems to indicate his father's guilt, Barry makes proving his father's innocence a priority. The murder occurred shortly after Barry returned victorious from a school spelling bee, and Barry placed the trophy he won on his mother's grave in her memory. Barry is also part of the main cast of the relaunched Justice League series, making his debut in the series' second issue.

Writers Robert Venditti and Van Jensen and artist Brett Booth became the new creative team on The Flash as of issue #30 (June 2014). This run introduced the New 52 incarnation of Wally West as a troubled twelve-year-old, and featured him first acquiring super-speed powers; it also reintroduced the original Reverse-Flash, Eobard Thawne, to the new continuity. This volume of The Flash concluded with issue #52 (July 2016).

Volume 5 (2016–2020)
The fifth volume of The Flash was written in its entirety by Joshua Williamson. As part of the line-wide relaunch DC Rebirth, Williamson's run began with the one-shot The Flash: Rebirth (vol. 2) #1 (August 2016) and continued from The Flash (vol. 5) #1 (August 2016) on a twice-monthly schedule. This volume starred Barry Allen, carrying over from the New 52 volume, but also featured various other speedsters as supporting characters. Among them was the original incarnation of Wally West, who was revealed to have been lost in the Speed Force and erased from everyone's memories; the New 52 incarnation, thereafter referred to as Wallace West, was retconned to be a separate character and gained a superhero identity as the new Kid Flash. Other new speedster characters introduced in this volume included new antagonist Godspeed, and Avery Ho as the Flash of China.

This volume of The Flash crossed over twice with Batman. The crossover event "The Button", central to the over-arcing DC Rebirth story and setting up the event miniseries Doomsday Clock, ran through issues #21–22 (June–July 2017). The story arc "The Price", a tie-in to the event comic Heroes in Crisis, ran through issues #64–65 (April 2019). 

Issue #88 (April 2020) was technically the final issue of this volume, as numbering on The Flash was then reset to add together all issue counts from volumes 1–5. However, Joshua Williamson's run on the series continued under the new numbering.

Volume 1 restored (2020–2023)
Original numbering on The Flash began with an oversized celebratory issue #750 (May 2020). However, the series continued otherwise uninterrupted from where volume 5 had left off. Joshua Williamson was ultimately the longest-serving writer to stay on a given title from the beginning of DC Rebirth, concluding his run of 101 regular issues on the title with #762 (September 2020). This was followed by a four-issue story arc written by Kevin Shinick, and a one-issue instalment of the crossover event "Endless Winter". 

As part of the line-wide relaunch Infinite Frontier, Jeremy Adams began as the current ongoing writer on The Flash with issue #768. Following Barry Allen's departure to join the multiversal team Justice Incarnate, Wally West resumes his role as the main Flash of the series.

 Volume 6 (2023-present) 
In March 2023, it was announced that The Flash'' would be relaunched as part of the Dawn of DC initiative with #1, while retaining a legacy numbering of #801. The new run would be written by Si Spurrier with art by Mike Deodato.

Collected editions

The Flash Archives

The Flash Chronicles

Showcase Presents: The Flash

The Flash Vol. 1 (1959–1985)

The Flash vol. 2 (1987–2006) Old Editions

The Flash vol. 2 (1987–2006)

The Flash: The Fastest Man Alive (2007–2008)

The Flash vol. 2 continued (2007–2008)

The Flash vol. 3 (2010–2011)

New 52

DC Rebirth and Infinite Frontier

Other Collections

References

External links
 
 
 
 
 
 
 
 

1959 comics debuts
1985 comics endings
1987 comics debuts
2006 comics endings
2007 comics debuts
2009 comics endings
2010 comics debuts
2011 comics endings
2011 comics debuts
Comics by Gardner Fox
Comics by Geoff Johns
Comics by Grant Morrison
Comics by Len Wein
Comics by Mark Millar
Comics by Mark Waid
Comics by Paul Kupperberg
DC Comics titles
Flash (comics)
GLAAD Media Award for Outstanding Comic Book winners
Superhero comics